This is a list of international trips made by Alexis Tsipras, as Prime Minister of Greece, from 26 January 2015 to 8 July 2019.

Summary of international trips

2015 

Tsipras' trips in 2015:

2016

2017

2018

2019

References 

Lists of 21st-century trips
21st century in international relations
Lists of diplomatic visits by heads of state
International prime ministerial trips made by Alexis Tsipras
Diplomatic visits by heads of government